Parvathi Parameswarulu is a 1981 Telugu-language film starring Chiranjeevi.

Cast
Chandra Mohan as Murali
Chiranjeevi as Mohan
 Prabha as Sunitha
 Swapna as Geeta
 Kaikala Satyanarayana as Paramesam
 Allu Rama Lingaiah as Narada
 Sowcar Janaki as Parvathi
 Hema Sundar
 Athili Lakshmi
 Jayamalini
 Halam
 Prabhakar Reddy as guest appearance
 Narasimha Raju as guest appearance
 Telephone Satyanarayana
 P.R. Anand
 Ravi Kiran
 D. Kameswara Rao
 Narasimha Rao

Production Companies
 Production Company: Pallavi Pictures
 Studios: Prasad, AVM Studios & Karpagam
 Recording & Re-recording: Gemini Studios
 Outdoor Unit: Sarada Enterprises * Pallavi Cine Services
 Processing & Printing: Prasad Color Laboratories
 Sound Processing: R.K. Laboratories

Songs
All songs were composed by Chellapilla Satyam and written by Veturi.

References

External links
 

1981 films
1980s Telugu-language films
Films scored by Satyam (composer)